Mize is a town in Smith County, Mississippi, United States. The population was 285 at the 2000 census.

It is the home of the Mississippi Watermelon Festival.

History
Mize was settled by Europeans by the early 1900s on the Gulf and Ship Island Railroad lines, though immigrants from Scotland may have settled the area as early as 1810. Choctaw Indians had lived in the area for thousands of years, and were being forced westward by the early 1800s. It is proximate to Sullivan's Hollow, Mississippi, the home of outlaw William Cicero "Wild Bill" Sullivan.

On April 6, 2005, an F-3 tornado struck Mize High School. The school's second floor was ripped off and the entire structure was severely damaged. Reconstruction efforts were completed in 2007.

The mayor of Mize is Joe Hancock.

Geography

Demographics

2020 census

As of the 2020 United States census, there were 317 people, 88 households, and 64 families residing in the town.

2000 census
As of the census of 2000, there were 285 people, 117 households, and 71 families residing in the town. The population density was 122.2 people per square mile (47.2/km2). There were 132 housing units at an average density of 56.6 per square mile (21.9/km2). The racial makeup of the town was 97.54% White, 1.75% African American, 0.35% from other races, and 0.35% from two or more races. Hispanic or Latino of any race were 1.05% of the population.

There were 117 households, out of which 31.6% had children under the age of 18 living with them, 50.4% were married couples living together, 8.5% had a female householder with no husband present, and 38.5% were non-families. 36.8% of all households were made up of individuals, and 21.4% had someone living alone who was 65 years of age or older. The average household size was 2.44 and the average family size was 3.25.

In the town, the population was spread out, with 28.4% under the age of 18, 6.7% from 18 to 24, 25.3% from 25 to 44, 22.5% from 45 to 64, and 17.2% who were 65 years of age or older. The median age was 38 years. For every 100 females, there were 88.7 males. For every 100 females age 18 and over, there were 82.1 males.

The median income for a household in the town was $20,000, and the median income for a family was $35,625. Males had a median income of $30,714 versus $14,688 for females. The per capita income for the town was $12,647. About 26.4% of families and 28.3% of the population were below the poverty line, including 38.1% of those under the age of eighteen and 32.8% of those 65 or over.

Education
The Town of Mize is served by the Smith County School District. Mize Attendance Center (K-12) provides education for the area. The school's mascot is Bully the Bulldog. The school's colors are blue and gold.

Notable people
Eugene Sims, former professional football player for St. Louis/Los Angeles Rams (2010–2016)
Prentiss Walker, the first Republican to represent Mississippi in the U.S. House of Representatives since Reconstruction

See also
Sullivans Hollow, a nearby valley

References

External links
 

Towns in Smith County, Mississippi
Towns in Mississippi